The Brickyard, sometimes known as the Brickyard Mall, is a shopping mall located in Chicago, Illinois, U.S. Built in 1977 as an enclosed shopping mall featuring J. C. Penney, Kmart, and Montgomery Ward, it was redeveloped in 2003 as a strip mall. The center's anchor stores are Jewel, Target, Marshalls, and Lowe's. The Brickyard is owned and managed by CBRE Group.

History
Maisel and Associates, a real estate company based out of Southfield, Michigan, worked with local developer Harry Chaddick to develop The Brickyard. Their research determined a need for a shopping mall on the northwestern side of Chicago, Illinois. The center was named The Brickyard because it was formerly on the site of a brickyard for the Carey Brick Company. It was also the site of a former ski resort. Due to the elevation of the hill, the development of the mall is divided into sections. The first section of the mall to open was a "convenience center" featuring a Jewel supermarket and a Kmart discount store on either side of a strip mall. This section of the mall opened in 1977 while the second phase, a 100-store enclosed mall with Montgomery Ward and J. C. Penney, opened in 1979. Carson Pirie Scott was also considered for a third anchor store to the mall, but Maisel was unable to secure a lease for the chain.

As the shopping mall did not encompass the entirety of the former brickyard, portions of it remained vacant until 1983, when the city of Chicago acquired a $10,000,000 grant to demolish the remaining unused portions of the former brickyard and sell the lot to Maisel and Associates for future mall expansion. MetLife bought the mall from Maisel and Associates in December 1986 for an undisclosed price. At the time, The Brickyard was 99 percent leased.  As part of the acquisition, an adjacent strip mall called Bricktown Square also began immediately to the south; this center included Toys "R" Us, Frank's Nursery & Crafts, Sport Mart sporting goods store, and a six-screen cinema owned by Plitt Theatres.

In 1997, the Kmart at The Brickyard was the first in the Chicago area to be renovated into that chain's "Big Kmart" concept, which included a small grocery section. Despite this change, the mall saw a rapid decrease in tenancy at the end of the 20th century due to the bankruptcies of Kmart and Montgomery Ward, combined with the closure of J. C. Penney. By 2003, the mall was nearly 80 percent vacant, so the city council approved a $100,000,000 redevelopment plan to demolish the structure. Opening in its place would be a strip mall with Target and Lowe's, along with a relocated Jewel supermarket.

Whitehall Fund, which redeveloped the mall, sold it in 2004 to Inland Real Estate except for the Lowe's and Target stores, which were sold to those respective chains. The Brickyard is owned by CBRE Group.

References

1977 establishments in Illinois
Demolished shopping malls in the United States
Shopping malls established in 1977
Shopping malls in Chicago